, provisional designation , is a background asteroid from the central region of the asteroid belt, approximately  in diameter. It was discovered on 8 October 1989, by Japanese astronomers Nobuhiro Kawasato and Tsutomu Hioki at the Okutama Observatory  in Japan. The asteroid has a tentative rotation period of 3.1 hours.

Orbit and classification 

The assumed stony S-type is a non-family asteroid from the main belt's background population. It orbits the Sun in the central main-belt at a distance of 2.2–3.0 AU once every 4 years and 2 months (1,527 days; semi-major axis of 2.6 AU). Its orbit has an eccentricity of 0.17 and an inclination of 10° with respect to the ecliptic.

Its first observation was a precovery taken at the Palomar Observatory on 30 September 1989, extending the asteroid's observation arc by just 9 days prior to its official discovery observation.

Numbering and naming 

This minor planet was numbered by the Minor Planet Center on 2 February 1999. As of 2018, it has not been named.

Physical characteristics

Diameter and albedo 

The asteroid was predicted to cross the focal plane array of the Infrared Astronomical Satellite (IRAS). However, it was missed on each of its seven planned observation and was never detected. According to the "missed predictions file" of the supplemental IRAS minor planet survey (SIMPS), the body was expected to have a diameter of 13.5 kilometers and an absolute magnitude of 13.20.

Based on an absolute magnitude of 13.99, and an assumed standard albedo for stony asteroids of 0.20, the Collaborative Asteroid Lightcurve Link calculated a much smaller diameter of 4.7 kilometers, which agrees with a diameter of 4.1 kilometers, found by NASA's Wide-field Infrared Survey Explorer with its subsequent NEOWISE mission.

Rotation period 

In October 2010, a rotational lightcurve for this asteroid was obtained from photometric observations at the Palomar Transient Factory in California. It rendered a tentative rotation period of  hours with a brightness variation of 0.08 in magnitude.

References

External links 
 Asteroid Lightcurve Database (LCDB), query form (info )
 Dictionary of Minor Planet Names, Google books
 Discovery Circumstances: Numbered Minor Planets (5001)-(10000) – Minor Planet Center
 
 

009942
Discoveries by Tsutomu Hioki
Discoveries by Nobuhiro Kawasato
19891008